General John Regan may refer to:

 General John Regan (play), a 1913 comedy play
 General John Regan (1921 film), a silent British film adaptation directed by Harold M. Shaw
 General John Regan (1933 film), a British film adaptation directed by Henry Edwards